The Moscow dialect or Moscow accent, sometimes Central Russian, is the spoken Russian language variety used in Moscow – one of the two major pronunciation norms of the Russian language alongside the Saint Petersburg norm. Influenced by both Northern and Southern Russian dialects, the Moscow dialect is the basis of the Russian literary language.

Overview
The 1911 edition of the Encyclopædia Britannica wrote:

Examples

References

Russian dialects
Culture in Moscow
City colloquials